Jesús de Machaca Municipality is the sixth municipal section of the Ingavi Province in the  La Paz Department in Bolivia. It was created by Law No. 2351 on May 7, 2002, during the presidency of Jorge Quiroga Ramírez.  Its seat is Jesús de Machaca.

Geography 
Jesús de Machaca lies south of Lake Titicaca. The Chilla-Kimsa Chata mountain range traverses the municipality. Some of the highest mountains of the municipality are listed below:

Division 
The municipality consists of the following ten cantons:
 Aguallamaya - 1,694 inhabitants (2001)
 Chama - 1,278 inhabitants
 Cuipa España de Machaca - 662 inhabitants
 Jesús de Machaca - 862 inhabitants
 Kalla Tupac Katari  - 2,669 inhabitants
 Khonkho San Salvador - 755 inhabitants
 Mejillones de Machaca - 845 inhabitants
 Santa Ana de Machaca - 363 inhabitants
 Santo Domingo de Machaca - 588 inhabitants
 Villa Asunción de Machaca - 3,244 inhabitants

The people 
The people are predominantly indigenous citizens of Aymara descent.

Places of interest 
Some of the tourist attractions of the municipality are:

 The archaeological site of Qhunqhu Wankani in Jesús de Machaca Canton
 Jesús de Machaca, an indigenous community
 Yakayuni saltflats in Jesús de Machaca Canton where salt exploitation is possible
 Uru Iruito community in Jesús de Machaca Canton and the Urus Iruito museum in Jesús de Machaca

See also 
 Awallamaya Lake
 Jach'a Jawira

References 

 www.ine.gov.bo / census 2001: Jesús de Machaca Municipality

External links 
 Jesús de Machaca Municipality: population data and map  (Spanish) 
 Website of Jesús de Machaca Municipality (CEBEM - Centro Boliviano de Estudios Multidisciplinarios)

Municipalities of La Paz Department (Bolivia)